A diamanté (also spelled diamante) is a glittering ornament, such as an artificial jewel (e.g. a rhinestone) or a sequin.

Diamante may also refer to:

Places

Argentina
 Diamante, Entre Ríos, a municipio in Diamante Department
 Diamante Caldera, a volcanic caldera partly in the Province of Mendoza
 Diamante River, a river in the Province of Mendoza
 Laguna del Diamante, a lake in the Province of Mendoza

Elsewhere
 Diamante, Paraíba, Brazil, a municipality
 Diamante Caldera, Chile, a volcanic caldera partly in Santiago Metropolitan Region
 Diamante, Calabria, Italy, a comune in the province of Cosenza

People
 Diamante (musician) (born 1996), singer
 David Diamante (born 1971), American ring announcer
 Fra Diamante (1430–1498), Italian fresco painter
 Juan Bautista Diamante (1625–1687), Spanish dramatist
 Diamante Medaglia Faini (1724–1770), Italian poet and composer
 Diamante (male wrestler) (born 1992), Mexican luchador enmascarado
 Diamante (female wrestler) (born 1990), American professional wrestler formerly known as Angel Rose
 Diamante Azul (born 1982), Mexican professional wrestler
 Diamante Merybrown, Spanish drag queen

Music
 Diamante Music Group, a California-based independent record label distributor
 Diamante, a 1988 EP by Sasha Sökol
 Diamanté, a 2017 EP by At the Drive-In
 "Diamante", a song by Zucchero from 1989 album Oro incenso e birra

Other uses
 Diamante citron, a type of citron fruit from Italy
 Diamante poem, a style of poetry
 Mitsubishi Diamante, a car built by Mitsubishi Motors between 1990 and 2004
 Diamante, a One Piece character

See also
 Diamond (disambiguation)